Cremersia may refer to:
 Cremersia (fly), a genus of flies in the family Phoridae
 Cremersia (plant), a genus of plants in the family Gesneriaceae